The following is a complete episode list of the anthology science fiction television series Out of the Unknown, which aired on BBC2 over four series between 4 October 1965 and 30 June 1971. The first two series were made and broadcast in black and white, and the latter two in colour.

Many Out of the Unknown episodes were adaptations of short stories and novels. In such cases, the list below credits the story to the original author and lists the adapter in the following column. Instances where an adaptation was broadcast under a title different from that of the original work are footnoted as appropriate. Where a script was an original commission, the screenwriter is credited as the author and the “Adapted by” column is marked “n/a”.

Only twenty episodes of the series survive in the archives today, with an additional episode only existing partially (missing approximately 20 minutes). The “Exists?” column indicates whether an episode has survived or not. In some cases, short clips and/or audio recordings of missing episodes have survived – these are indicated in the footnotes.

Series 1
Series 1 was broadcast on Monday nights at 8:00pm. It was produced by Irene Shubik. Two episodes are missing, while ten survive, making it the most complete season of the show.

Series 2
Series 2 was broadcast on Thursday nights at 9:30pm, except "The Prophet", which was broadcast on Saturday only two days after "Satisfaction Guaranteed". It was produced by Irene Shubik and the script editor was Michael Imison. Nine of the thirteen episodes are missing, leaving only four surviving.

Series 3
Series 3 was broadcast on Wednesday nights at 9:00pm. It was produced by Alan Bromly and the script editor was Roger Parkes. However, all the scripts used in this series were commissioned by Irene Shubik. This was the first series to be made in colour. Only two episodes are known to exist (one partially), making it the most incomplete season of the show. This season also has the most surviving off-air soundtracks, with three in total used to reconstruct their respective episodes.

Series 4
Series 4 was broadcast on Wednesday nights at 9:20pm. It was produced by Alan Bromly and the script editor was Roger Parkes. Unlike previous series, only one episode was an adaptation. Six of the eleven episodes are missing, leaving five episodes surviving. A reconstruction using surviving audio exists for one episode.

Notes

References

External links

Lists of British drama television series episodes
Lists of British science fiction television series episodes
Lists of anthology television series episodes